Alfred Conard can refer to:

 Alfred Fellenberg Conard (1835 – 1906), horticulturalist and founder of Star Roses and Plants/Conard-Pyle
 Alfred F. Conard, professor of law at University of Michigan, great-nephew of Alfred Fellenberg Conard and son of Henry Shoemaker Conard